Southport Eastbank Street was a railway station in Southport, Merseyside.

History
The station opened on 21 July 1848 as the temporary northern terminus of the Liverpool, Crosby and Southport Railway, and was the first railway station in Southport. Situated between Eastbank Street and Portland Street, it consisted of a single platform together with a run-round loop and one siding. In 1850 the platform was extended, and an extra line was constructed along with two additional sidings on the east side. The station closed on 22 August 1851, following the completion of a permanent terminal station at Chapel Street, though the line remains open and is today used by trains on the Merseyrail Northern Line. The only remaining traces of the station are the station master's house and a ticket office, adjacent to the level crossing on Portland Street.

The house is now let to Southport Model Railway Society.

References

, and Avon Anglia Publications, .

Disused railway stations in the Metropolitan Borough of Sefton
Railway stations in Great Britain opened in 1848
Railway stations in Great Britain closed in 1851
Buildings and structures in Southport